Liz Neeley is a science communicator, researcher, and founder of Liminal Creations. She was formerly the Executive Director of The Story Collider, a nonprofit organization that focuses on true, personal stories inspired by science. She began her career in marine biology and conservation and has since become an expert in the use of narrative storytelling for effective science communication.

Education and early career 
Neeley received her Bachelor of Arts in Marine Biology in 2002. She then completed her Master's degree at Boston University in Ecology and Evolution in 2005. Her graduate research centered on the evolution of color patterns and visual communication systems in tropical reef fishes—wrasses and parrotfish—in the laboratory of Gil Rosenthal.

Following graduate school, she began a career in marine conservation, applying her general subject matter knowledge to science advocacy. She began working at SeaWeb, a communications-based nonprofit organization committed to promoting understanding around ocean and conservation science to a host of stakeholders—from decision makers to community leaders to the media. By strategically communicating to these groups, SeaWeb worked to foster the development of measures to protect the ocean. From 2005 to 2006, Neeley worked with SeaWeb's Asia Pacific Program, partnering with local communities and researchers in Fiji and Papua New Guinea to build communications capacity for them to share their knowledge of local coral reefs ecosystems with the local media. In 2006, she transitioned to the role of Program Manager at SeaWeb, where she helped launch the "Too Precious to Wear" campaign, partnering with the fashion industry to raise awareness around the toll of dredging deep sea coral. The campaign sought to impose limits on coral use in fashion, design, and home decor through the Convention on International Trade in Endangered Species.

Science communication career 
Following her tenure at SeaWeb, Neeley focused her career more on efforts around science communication, training scientists on how best to share their knowledge of science with a range of stakeholders. She has served as a contributing author on a range of books on science communication. She wrote a section on utilizing social media to promote a scientist's work for Science Blogging: The Essential Guide and contributed a chapter on communicating controversial topics in science on social media in Effective Risk Communication. She also co-authored Escape from the Ivory Tower: a guide to making your science matter during her time at the nonprofit COMPASS.

Neeley has lent her expertise to a number of groups centered on communicating science to the public, previously serving on the advisory board of the CommLab at MIT from 2015 to 2017 and on the Advisory Council of Ensia magazine. She also holds a Lecturer appointment at Yale School of Medicine in conjunction with the National Neuroscience Curriculum Initiative.

COMPASS 
In 2008, Neeley joined COMPASS, a nonprofit organization co-founded by marine ecologist and former NOAA Administrator Jane Lubchenco to train scientists to more effectively share their expertise with journalists, decision makers, and the public at large. There, Neeley served as the Assistant Director of Science Outreach, working to develop their training programs in science communication and connecting scientists to public conversations around their expertise. She also launched COMPASS's training programs around how scientists can more effectively utilize social media to share their work and engage with a broader audience. During her tenure at COMPASS, she was affiliate staff at the University of Washington in the School of Aquatic & Fisheries Sciences.

The Story Collider 
In 2015, Neeley became the executive director of The Story Collider, a nonprofit organization that brings personal stories inspired by science to the public through live shows and a weekly podcast. The organization also trains scientists on how to employ the tools of storytelling to become better communicators. In this role, she's also spearheaded efforts in applying storytelling to more traditionally academic forms of communication, curating a collection of "Conservation stories from the front lines" for PLOS Biology. She has spoken about the importance of storytelling for science at a number of universities and organizations, including the Beckman Institute for Advanced Science and Technology, the University of Washington College of the Environment's Bevan Series, Yale University, and at Northwestern University. In the policy arena, she has contributed a position paper on the use of narrative persuasion to help scientists ethically navigate the world of decision making at the Institute on Science for Global Policy in partnership with Sigma Xi. She has also contributed her expertise to providing recommendations for how to have better conversations around the COVID-19 pandemic.

Neeley has also told stories of her own for The Story Collider, including a story about a field expedition gone awry during her time as an undergraduate and another about her colleagues forgetting her while working on coral conservation in Fiji.

Personal life 
Neeley is married to Ed Yong, science journalist at The Atlantic. They occasionally collaborate on speaking engagements.

References

External links 
 

Living people
American women scientists
Science communicators
American marine biologists
American nonprofit executives
Boston University alumni
University System of Maryland alumni
Year of birth missing (living people)
21st-century American women